The Saturn Sky is a roadster that was produced by Saturn, and was initially released in the first quarter of 2006 as a 2007 model. It uses the Kappa automobile platform shared with the Pontiac Solstice. The Sky concept was shown at the 2005 North American International Auto Show, with the production version following at the 2006 show. It was built at GM's Wilmington Assembly plant in Wilmington, Delaware, alongside the Solstice. The Sky featured 18-inch (457 mm) wheels and a 2.4 L Ecotec LE5 inline-four engine that produced , a new 2.0-litre turbocharged direct injected inline-four engine that made  as well as an optional dealer-installed turbo upgrade kit that made . Both five-speed manual and automatic transmissions were available.

The styling for the Sky, penned by Franz von Holzhausen, was based on the Vauxhall VX Lightning Concept's design. It was available in some European markets as the Opel GT. A rebadged version named the Daewoo G2X was unveiled as a concept vehicle for the South Korean market in 2006. The production version was released in September 2007.

The Wilmington Assembly plant closed in July 2009, ending production as both the Pontiac and Saturn nameplates were retired.

Sky Red Line

A Red Line model of the Sky was introduced on April 11, 2006 at the New York Auto Show. It uses the same  turbocharged Ecotec engine as the Pontiac Solstice, as well as the same standard 5-speed Aisin manual transmission. An automatic transmission is optional.

The Red Line had a standard torque-sensing limited-slip differential, standard StabiliTrak stability control, and an enhanced sport suspension over the standard Sky (available as a dealer-add on for regular models). Other exterior enhancements included dual exhausts, 18-inch wheels, and a specific front fascia modeled for the Red Line. On the inside, the Red Line had a special leather-wrapped steering wheel with audio controls, special embroidery on the seats and floor mats, metallic door sill covers and stainless steel pedals, special tachometer and gauges, and a digital boost gauge in the Driver Information Center. The Red Line model started shipping in the third quarter of 2006, with a retail price starting at $29,795.

Specifications
2007 Saturn Sky (Base model) specifications:
0-: 6.9 seconds
0-: 21.9 seconds
1/4 mile: 15.2 seconds @ 
Top speed:  drag limited
-0 mph braking: 
 skidpad: 0.86 g
EPA fuel economy:  city/ highway

2007 Saturn Sky Red Line specifications:
0-: 5.2 seconds
0-: 14.7 seconds
1/4 mile: 14.0 seconds @ 
Top speed:  drag limited
-0 mph braking: 
 skidpad: 0.87 g
EPA fuel economy:  city / ?? highway

Limited editions

2008
For the 2008 model year, GM offered the Carbon Flash Special Edition Saturn Sky. Unlike the two Limited Edition models launched later in 2009, its production was slightly higher at 550 units. The Carbon Flash Special Edition featured a unique metallic Carbon Flash paint color, removable silver racing stripe standard, and Monsoon premium audio standard. The largest differentiator, however, is Carbon Flash Edition's silver inserts in the interior seating and steering wheel that provide a black-on-silver appearance.

2009
For the 2009 model year, GM launched two limited-edition Saturn Sky roadsters jointly; Ruby Red Special Edition and Hydro Blue Limited Edition. Both are VIN-coded and some blue books track it as a limited-edition vehicle. All limited editions featured Monsoon premium stereos.

The Ruby Red Edition featured the Ruby Red color and a unique, removable carbon racing stripe that was exclusive to the 500 Sky units produced in this trim.

The Hydro Blue Edition featured a Hydro Blue color, as well as matching blue-colored stitching in the seats and gear shifter. Also, the word Sky stitched into the seats is changed to matching-blue color as well. All Hydro Blue Edition Saturn Sky units were sold with the removable silver racing stripe.

GM had planned to make 500 Hydro Blue units to match the 500 Ruby Red Special Edition Sky build count. However, Hydro Blue units were being built as GM was declaring bankruptcy, resulting in the immediate termination of the Kappa platform. As such, only 89 Hydro Blue Edition Saturn Sky roadsters were built.

The Hydro Blue paint color (and seat/shifter blue stitching) was offered on the Pontiac Solstice. However, it is not VIN coded as a unique/limited edition, racing stripes were not standard, and seats do not have blue-colored lettering. Hydro Blue is the rarest color in all three vehicles; Sky Roadster, Solstice Roadster, and Solstice Coupe.

2010 production
In April and May 2009 the Wilmington, DE. plant built thirty 2010 model year VIN-coded cars on the Kappa platform. Of those, 8 were Saturn Skys. The other remaining included 12 Pontiac Solstice Coupes, eight Pontiac Solstice roadsters, and two Opel GTs. They were then used as GM company vehicles to be evaluated and also as special event display vehicles. These vehicles were built to the 2010 model year specs with 2010 model year changes and had legal 2010 VIN numbers. All 8 2010 SKYs were purchased by the same dealer in Minnesota and subsequently sold as used vehicles. Among changes to the SKY for the 2010 model year was the addition of remote start on automatic-equipped cars, option package changes and additions, and three new colors. Those colors were Kinetic Blue, Opus Green, and Dark Labyrinth Metallic.

2010 SKYs produced
 SKY, Black Lt. Cashmere Leather Tan LE5 Auto Chrome Air
 SKY Red Line, Kinetic Blue Black Leather Black LNF Auto Polished Air
 SKY Red Line, Black Red Leather Black LNF Auto Polished Air
 SKY Red Line, Dk Labyrinth Met Black Leather Black LNF Auto Chrome Air
 SKY, Black Lt. Cashmere Leather Tan LE5 Manual Chrome
 SKY Red Line, Black Black Leather Black LNF Auto Chrome Air
 SKY Red Line, Dk Labyrinth Met Black Leather Black LNF Manual Chrome Air
 SKY, Dk Labyrinth Met Black Leather Black LE5 Auto Chrome

Daewoo G2X
Daewoo had already shown a version of the Opel Speedster called the Daewoo Speedster, but this remained a one-off. In 2006, they showed a show car called the Daewoo G2X; simply a rebadge of the Saturn Sky. In September 2007 it entered production, for the South Korean market only. It remained on sale until early 2009 and 179 examples were delivered in total. The South Korean version was only offered with the turbocharged  engine from the Sky RedLine, combined with the five-speed automatic transmission.

Production by model year

Yearly American sales

See also
 Pontiac Solstice
 Vauxhall VX220 and Opel Speedster – European-market predecessors, both based on the Lotus Elise and built by Lotus Cars

References

External links

Official Saturn Sky website
Official Daewoo G2X website

Sky
Roadsters
Hardtop convertibles
Rear-wheel-drive vehicles
Cars introduced in 2007
Motor vehicles manufactured in the United States